In mathematics, Hausdorff measure is a generalization of the traditional notions of area and volume to non-integer dimensions, specifically fractals and their Hausdorff dimensions.

The zero-dimensional Hausdorff measure is the number of points in the set (if the set is finite) or ∞ if the set is infinite. Thus, the concept of the Hausdorff measure generalizes the Lebesgue measure and its notions of counting, length, and area. It also generalizes volume. In fact, there are d-dimensional Hausdorff measures for any d ≥ 0, which is not necessarily an integer. These measures are fundamental in geometric measure theory. They appear naturally in  harmonic analysis or potential theory.

Definition
Let  be a metric space. For any subset , let  denote its diameter, that is

Define

Note that  is monotone nonincreasing in  since the larger  is, the more collections of sets are permitted, making the infimum not larger. Thus,  exists but may be infinite. Let

It can be seen that  is an outer measure (more precisely, it is a metric outer measure). By Carathéodory's extension theorem, its restriction to the σ-field of Carathéodory-measurable sets is a measure.

In the above definition the sets in the covering are arbitrary. In  restricting the covering sets to be balls may change the measures but does not change the dimension of the measured sets.

Properties of Hausdorff measures

In fact, for any Borel set E,

where αd is the volume of the unit d-ball; it can be expressed using Euler's gamma function

This is  
,
where  is the volume of the unit diameter d-ball.

Remark. Some authors adopt a definition of Hausdorff measure slightly different from the one chosen here, the difference being that the value  defined above is multiplied by the factor , so that Hausdorff d-dimensional measure coincides exactly with Lebesgue measure in the case of Euclidean space.

Relation with Hausdorff dimension

It turns out that  may have a finite, nonzero value for at most one . That is, the Hausdorff Measure is zero for any value above a certain dimension and infinity below a certain dimension, analogous to the idea that the area of a line is zero and the length of a 2D shape is in some sense infinity. This leads to one of several possible equivalent definitions of the Hausdorff dimension:

where we take

and
.

Note that it is not guaranteed that the Hausdorff measure must be finite and nonzero for some d, and indeed the measure at the Hausdorff dimension may still be zero; in this case, the Hausdorff dimension still acts as a change point between measures of zero and infinity.

Generalizations
In geometric measure theory and related fields, the Minkowski content is often used to measure the size of a subset of a metric measure space. For suitable domains in Euclidean space, the two notions of size coincide, up to overall normalizations depending on conventions.

In fractal geometry, some fractals with Hausdorff dimension  have zero or infinite -dimensional Hausdorff measure. For example, almost surely the image of planar Brownian motion has Hausdorff dimension 2 and its two-dimensional Hausdorff measure is zero. In order to "measure" the "size" of such sets, the following variation on the notion of the Hausdorff measure can be considered:

In the definition of the measure  is replaced with  where  is any monotone increasing set function satisfying 

A -dimensional set  may satisfy  but  with an appropriate  Examples of gauge functions include

The former gives almost surely positive and -finite measure to the Brownian path in  when , and the latter when .

See also 
 Hausdorff dimension
 Geometric measure theory
 Measure theory
 Outer measure

References

 .
 .
 .
 .
 
 .

External links
 Hausdorff dimension at Encyclopedia of Mathematics
 Hausdorff measure at Encyclopedia of Mathematics

Fractals
Measures (measure theory)
Metric geometry
Dimension theory